Maple Avenue Historic District or Maple Avenue District may refer to:

Maple Avenue Maple Lane Historic District, Highland Park, Illinois, 
Maple Avenue District, Danville, Kentuck, listed on the NRHP in Boyle County, Kentucky
Maple Avenue Historic District (Cambridge, Massachusetts), NRHP-listed
 Maple Avenue Historic District (Elmira, New York), listed on the NRHP 
Maple Avenue Historic District (Hannibal, Missouri)

See also
Maple Street Historic District (disambiguation)